A meibography is an image of the morphology of the meibomian glands. Different technologies exist to perform a meibography in a non-invasive manner. Meibography is used in meibomian gland dysfunction diagnosis.

See also 
 Meibomian gland
 Dry eye syndrome
 Blepharitis

References 

Medical imaging
Eye procedures